Carlos Aguirre may refer to:

Carlos Aguirre (equestrian) (born 1952), Mexican Olympic equestrian
Carlos Aguirre (volleyball) (born 1938), Mexican Olympic volleyball player